Reno Rumble: East v West is the second season of Australian reality television series Reno Rumble, it aired on the Nine Network. Unlike the first season which pit former contestants from The Block against former contestants from House Rules, this season had state based rookie teams from either the East or West side of Australia competing against each other. It was hosted by Scott Cam and Shelley Craft and judged by Colin McAllister and Justin Ryan. It premiered Monday 21 March 2016. The first episode was available online (9Now & Facebook page) one day ahead of its premiere on Sunday 20 March 2016. Homebase is set at Pipemakers Park, Maribyrnong River.

Due to unexpected low ratings, from Monday 4 April only 2 episodes a week aired and was pushed back an hour to 8:30 pm timeslot. The season was won by Lisa & John who received $100,000.

Format
Each week each individual team withinTeam West (red) and Team East (blue) are allocated two rooms to deliver at the end of each week. The homeowners give each individual team a brief for their rooms. The whole team (red or blue) with the highest score are the weeks winning team and avoid elimination, the lowest scoring individual team in the losing team will be eliminated.

Contestants
Nine has announced the 6 teams that will compete on Reno Rumble: East v West.

Elimination history

Weekly results

 The team was on the winning team
 The team had immunity
 The team were eliminated
 The team won the series
 The team came in second place in the series.

Results

Week 1
 Episodes 1 to 4
 Airdate — 21 to 27 March 2016
 Team West Homeowner — Sarah - she has been fighting a rare cancer, Hodgkin's Lymphoma, for seven years and is now in remission
 Team East Homeowner — Maddy - she is Sarahs best friend, who helped raise $180,000 for her treatment which has cured Sarahs cancer
 Description — Each team must deliver two rooms at the end of the week with the lowest scoring individual team on the losing team being eliminated. The team captain on the winning team will receive immunity for week 2. After results were announced, scotty announced there will be no elimination for week 1.

 Colour key:
  – Immunity
  – Eliminated
 – Advanced to Grand Final
  – Winning Team
  – Losing Team

Week 2
 Episodes 5 to 7
 Airdate — 28 March to 4 April 2016
 Team West Homeowner —  Chris & Kate - They have witnessed the heartache and loss of road trauma firsthand working in emergency services. They are huge supporters and close friends of Christine & David whom they nominated for their home to be renovated on the show
 Team East Homeowner —  Christine & David - This married couple have gone through heartbreak losing two daughters (Wendy & Melissa) in a car accident and another (Nicky) due to severe injuries from a car accident. They now care for Nicky's son, Blake, and focus on giving him a great future
 Description — Due to no elimination in week 1, this week will have the first elimination.

Week 3
 Episodes 8 & 9
 Airdate — 5 to 11 April 2016
 Team West Homeowner —  Joy - She is a single mother to daughter Tara and is a support care worker who brings in a modest wage but not enough to cover repairs needed after fire severely damaged her home in 2002 
 Team East Homeowner —  Peter and Michelle - This couple are parents to three (Matty, Naomi & Tamara) and are selfless members of the community. It was thanks to them that most of the Joy's family belongings were saved during the fire
 Description — Due to losing a team from elimination, the two individual teams in Team Red have to add an extra room to complete each making it three not two rooms

Week 4 (Semi-finals Week)
 Episodes 10 to 12
 Airdate — 12 to 19 April 2016
 Homeowner — Debbie - she has dedicated the last 30 years to the homeless using her home as a shelter, also distributes two vans full of second-hand goods to the homeless 
 Description — Due to being the only Red Team left, Dane & Leanne will join the Blue Team and become one. They will only be renovating one house, there are no team captains & there will be a double elimination

Week 5 (Grand Final Week)
 Episodes 13 to 15
 Airdate — 25 & 26 April 2016
 Homeowner —  Sue & Paul, the parents of Tara and Beccky who were nominated for the show by the latter before she died from an inherited kidney disease in November 2015
 Description — In The Final Week, redoing first seasons format, the two final teams must present a room within the first 48 hours and deliver the rest of their rooms at the end of the week. The couple who receives the highest score will win the season and receive $100,000

Ratings

 Colour key:
  – Highest rating during the series
  – Lowest rating during the series
  – An elimination was held in this episode

Notes

Preliminary ratings – viewers and nightly position
Week/episodes aired during Easter non-ratings period
Includes team space points
Episode was below 20 rank

References

2016 Australian television seasons